Kyle Bibb (born ) is an English former professional rugby league footballer who last played for the Doncaster RLFC in the Championship, as a .

He previously played in the Super League for Hull FC, Wakefield Trinity Wildcats (Heritage No. 1262), the Hull Kingston Rovers and the Harlequins RL, Bibb joined the Wakefield Trinity Wildcats after a season in the second team at Hull F.C. making many first team appearances throughout the 2009 season. He was on loaned to Harlequins RL but was recalled by Wakefield Trinity Wildcats. In September 2010 Kyle Bibb signed for Championship One side the Dewsbury Rams.

References

1987 births
Living people
Dewsbury Rams players
Doncaster R.L.F.C. players
English rugby league players
Hull Kingston Rovers players
London Broncos players
Rugby league props
Sheffield Eagles players
Wakefield Trinity players